Charlotte Dipanda (born in 1985, Yaoundé, Cameroon) is a Cameroonian singer, who plays mostly acoustic music. Her lyrics are in French, her native language Bakaka, and in Douala.

Biography
Dipanda made her first record with guitar player Jeannot Hens. It was released in 2002. She was spotted by Congolese musician Lokua Kanza, in an open-mic session at a Yaoundé club. She then moved to France, where she has worked with Congolese singer Papa Wemba. Dipanda has provided background vocals for Manu Dibango, Rokia Traoré and Axelle Red. Dipanda does most of her gigs in Europe, but has also performed in the Palais des sports in her native Yaoundé. Her first solo album is called Mispa, and was released in 2008. In 2014, she released her third album entitled 'Massa'. Her second album 'Dube L'am' was released in 2011. Charlotte Dipanda was one of the judges for the show The Voice Afrique francophone  broadcast on the channel Vox Africa in 2016. 
At the 2018 edition of the Balafon Music Awards, she received two awards, namely female voice of the year and clip of the year with sista.

Discography

Albums
 2002 Ndando Jeannot Hens ft. Charlotte Dipanda
 2008 Mispa
Bwel
To Be Nde Na
Mbasan
Ndutu Ndema
Longue
Ala Wone
Elle
Eyaya
Mispa
Ndando
Mbebi
Encore une fois

 2011 Dube I'am
Toma me
Coucou
Bodimbea (feat. Richard Bona)
Kumbe elolo
Mouane diob
Soma loba
Na nde
We nde ndja (feat. Jacob Desvarieux)
Sona ndolo
Mukusa
Maria
Mot a idika
Mboa
Mouanyang

 2015 Massa
Ndolo Bukatè (Un peu d'amour)
Aléa Mba (Soutiens-moi)
Laka Mba (Pardonnez-moi)
Massa (Introspection)
Elle n'a pas vu
Na Bia Tè (Si je savais)
Amore (Audio)
Alanè Mba (Emmène-moi)
Kénè So (Aller de l'avant)
Lena (Fille du Sahel)

 2018 Un Jour Dans Ma Vie
Un jour dans ma vie
Wei
Sista (c'est Yemi Alade)
Muna
A Ndolo
Nos Cachiers
Ewola Mudi
Sa Ngando
Duméa (feat Sallé John )

References and links

 Homepage Charlotte Dipanda
  Biography
 The Herald Cameroon 13/14 April 2009: Charlotte Dipanda
  Radio France International: Charlotte Dipanda Interview

1985 births
Living people
21st-century Cameroonian women singers
People from Yaoundé